Christmas in Indonesia (locally known as Natal, from the Portuguese word for Christmas) is celebrated with various traditions throughout the country. Indonesia has approximately 28 million Christians (of which about 30% are Roman Catholics). In regions with a Christian majority (Protestants and Catholics), there are Christmas celebrations with ceremonies and local food. In big cities, shopping centres are decorated with plastic Christmas trees and Sinterklas (derived from the Dutch word Sinterklaas). Many local television channels broadcast Christmas musical concerts and the annual national Christmas celebration organised by the government. In addition to traditional foods, there are also unique Christmas Day foods, such as cookies, like nastar (pineapple tart) and kastengel (from Dutch word kaasstengel), or 'putri salju'.

By region

Papua

In the Papua region, after Christmas mass, a ritual cooking of pork for feasting is held using a Barapen (grilling stone). The pork meat is cooked in between hot stones that are heated using wood. Instead of using matches, Papuan people scrape the wood continuously to produce heat to set it on fire. In order to prepare the Barapen, Papuan men dig a hole to put the hot stones in. At the same time, Papuan women prepare vegetables such as sweet potato, water spinach, fern, cassava, spinach, and papaya. First, hot stones are stacked on the base of the hole. Then, the pork and vegetables are put into the hole and covered with another layer of hot stones. The pork is cooked in the hole for half a day. The tradition of Barapen is an expression of gratitude, togetherness, sharing, and love, characterised by eating pork together.

Ambon
In Negeri Naku, South Leitimur, Ambon, there is a ceremony called cuci negeri (cleaning the nation). This ceremony symbolises the purification and liberation of sins from the local people and their environment. The cuci negeri starts with a gathering in the community function hall for each clan to hold their own traditional ritual. From there, the Ambonese walk to the traditional function hall. They do not walk in silence but sing and dance along with the sounds of tifa (traditional music instrument). Along the way, the women bring some offerings like betel, areca nut, and traditional drink called sopi. During Christmas eve celebrations in the Maluku, ship sirens sound and church bells ring at the same time.

Yogyakarta
In the Yogyakarta area, Christmas celebrations are marked by a wayang kulit adaptation of the Nativity scene. Church mass is led by the priest wearing traditional Javanese attire (wearing beskap and blankon) and speaking in the local language. Similar to Eid al-Fitr, during Christmas time, people visit friends and family; children may receive money in an envelope from elders.

Manado
The pre-Christmas celebrations in Manado start from 1 December when the regional government officers go on the "Christmas Safari" – observe the mass in a different district every day. As part of tradition, some residents of Manado join a carnival or visit and clean their families' graves. The series of Christmas celebrations end in the first week of January with a festival called kunci taon. During this festival, there is a carnival across the region featuring unique costumes.

Bali

Most Christian villages in Bali are located on the southern of the island. In those villages, road decorations called penjor (made from yellow coconut leaves) are made for Christmas, which symbolise the Anantaboga dragon. The Christmas celebration draws influence from Balinese Hinduism.

In Bali, the Christmas tree is made from chicken feathers. This unique tree has been imported to some European countries.

Toraja
Torajan people celebrate Christmas by having a cultural festival called Lovely December. This festival consists of mass dancing, a culinary festival, cultural carnival, bamboo music performance, and handicraft exhibition. The festival is ended by fireworks and Lettoan procession which is held on 26 December. Lettoan is a ritual of having pig parade with cultural symbols that represent three dimensions of human life. Those three symbols are:
 Saritatolamban, shaped like stairs, which represents a pray and hope for a better life (like the steps which always go up).
 The Sun, which represents the source of life light.
 Tabang flower, which represents success in the Torajan people's life.

North Sumatra

For the Batak in North Sumatera, the Christmas Day is always followed by sacrificing an animal as a result of people chipping in and saving the money months before. This tradition is called marbinda and shows togetherness and mutual cooperation. The sacrificed animal can be a pig, a buffalo, or an ox, and the meat will be shared to all the people that participate in the purchasing of the animal.

National Christmas Celebration 
Every year, Ministry of Religious Affairs holds the National Christmas Celebration of the Republic of Indonesia. The program started in 1993 as a suggestion from Tiopan Bernhard Silalahi, who was Minister of Administrative and Bureaucratic Reform in the Sixth Development Cabinet, who has Protestant background, to the then President of Indonesia Suharto. Since that, National Christmas Celebration has been held every year (and was held as a virtual event due to the COVID-19 pandemic in 2020-21), except in 2004, which was canceled as a condolence for the victims of the 2004 Indian Ocean earthquake and tsunami, in 2018, which was canceled as a condolence for the victims of the 2018 Sunda Strait tsunami, and in 2022, which was also planned to be cancelled before being delayed at the last minute as a condolence for the victims of the 2022 West Java earthquake. Until 2013, National Christmas Celebration was always held in Jakarta, the most common used venue was Jakarta Convention Center. But since 2014, the tradition was changed by the newly-elected President of Indonesia Joko Widodo. This is the list of National Christmas Celebration hosts since 2014:

See also 
Christianity in Indonesia

References

External links

Indonesia
Christianity in Indonesia